This supranational electoral calendar for the year 2013 lists the supranational elections held in 2013.

February
 17 February: Ecuador, 5 representatives for the Andean Parliament

October
 Security Council

November
 12 November: Human Rights Council
 24 November: Honduras, 20 representatives to the Central American Parliament

References

2013 elections
Supranational elections